EPI or Epi may refer to:

Science and technology

Mathematics
 Epigraph (mathematics)
 Epimorphism
Entropy power inequality, a result that relates to so-called "entropy power" of random variables
Extreme physical information, a principle in information theory

Medicine and health
 Echo-planar imaging
 Epidemiology
 Epinephrine, a neurotransmitter
 Epinephrine (medication)
 Epi-pen
 Exocrine pancreatic insufficiency, the inability to properly digest food due to a lack of digestive enzymes made by the pancreas
 Expanded Program on Immunization, a World Health Organization program

Biology
 Epidendrum, an orchid genus
 Epiphyllum hybrid, a cactus hybrid

Technology
 Episerver, a global e-commerce company
 Epitaxy, a semiconductor fabrication technique
 European Processor Initiative, a European project to build new low-power processors

Other sciences
 Eletrophotonic imaging, an imaging technique
 Epimer, one of a pair of diastereomers

Places
 Epi (island), in Vanuatu
 Portuguese India, also known as the Portuguese State of India (Portuguese: Estado Português da Índia)

People
 Enkhjargal Dandarvaanchig (born 1968), Mongolian musician
 Epi Taione (born 1979), Tongan rugby union footballer
 Juan Antonio San Epifanio (born 1959), Spanish basketball player

Organisations
 Ecology Project International, an American environmental organization
 Economic Policy Institute, an American economic think tank 
 Education Policy Institute, a British education think tank
 European Patent Institute, the professional association of European patent attorneys
 European Payments Initiative, a pan-European payment system

Language
 EF English Proficiency Index, a ranking of countries by their English skills
 Epi languages, a family of languages spoken on Epi island

Other uses
 Environmental Performance Index, quantifier of the environmental effect of a state's policies
 Ends per inch, the number of warp threads per inch of woven fabric
 Ethical positioning index, an index which measures how ethically a brand is positioned
 Exploding Plastic Inevitable, a series of multimedia events by Andy Warhol

See also